Lewis Kenneth "Kayo" Lunday (August 13, 1912 – July 13, 2005) was an American football offensive lineman for the New York Giants of the National Football League.

References

External links

1912 births
2005 deaths
American football offensive linemen
American football linebackers
Arkansas Razorbacks football players
New York Giants players
Players of American football from Oklahoma
People from Delaware County, Oklahoma